The white-red-white flag is a historic flag used by the Belarusian Democratic Republic in 1918 before Western Belarus was occupied by the Second Polish Republic and Eastern Belarus was occupied by Soviet Union as well as it formed a Soviet republic, which was known as Byelorussian Soviet Socialist Republic, then by the Belarusian national movement in Western Belarus followed by widespread unofficial use during the German occupation of Belarus between 1941 and 1944, and again after it regained its independence in 1991 until the 1995 referendum. 

Opposition groups have continued to use this flag, though its display in Belarus has been restricted by the government of Belarus, which claims it is linked with Nazi collaboration due to its use by Belarusian collaborators during World War II. The white-red-white flag has been used in protests against the government, most recently the 2020–2021 Belarusian protests, and by the Belarusian diaspora.

Colour scheme

History

Creation
The design of the flag used between 19 September 1991 and 5 June 1995 had originally been devised by the Belarusian Democratic Republic (March to December 1918). Red and white have traditionally been used in the Coat of arms of Lithuania, the state heraldry of the Grand Duchy of Lithuania and also the Polish–Lithuanian Commonwealth, both of which included lands that are now Belarus. There are several other theories explaining the flag's origin. One theory speaks of an allusion to the name of the country, White Ruthenia.

Interwar period
In 1918, the Belarusian People's Republic (BNR) was proclaimed, the symbols of which became the coat of arms "Pahonia" and the white-red-white flag. On 11 August, the newspaper Svobodnaya Belarus published the first official description of the flag and coat of arms. From 1919 to 1920, the white-red-white flag was used by Belarusian military formations as part of the Polish and Lithuanian armies. In 1920, the flag was used by participants in the Slutsk uprising.

Between 1921 and 1939 the white-red-white flag was used by the Belarusian national movement in Western Belorussia (part of the Second Polish Republic), both by political organisations like the Belarusian Peasants' and Workers' Union or the Belarusian Christian Democracy, and non-political organisations like the Belarusian Schools Society. The flag was also used by the Belarusian Special Battalion in the Lithuanian army. After the Soviet invasion of Poland and the annexation of modern-day West Belarus in 1939, the flag was forbidden by the Soviet administration in the newly acquired territories as well.

Second World War

During World War II the flag was used during Byelorussian collaboration with Nazi Germany, being used by the Belarusian Central Council and appearing on arm patches and other insignia worn by the Belorusian Auxiliary Police, Byelorussian Home Defence, and later the Belarusian division of the Waffen-SS. Duzh-Dushewski, the creator of the flag, however refused to cooperate with the Nazi occupation forces and hid a Jewish family in his house, for which he was sent to the Pravieniškės death camp.

Soviet era
After World War II, the flag was used by the Belarusian diaspora in the West and by a few groups opposing the Soviet government in Belarus itself. In the late 1980s, amid Mikhail Gorbachev's perestroika and glasnost program, the flag began to be used as a symbol of national revival and democratic changes in the Byelorussian Soviet Socialist Republic, which led to the end of the Soviet Union. This concerned the Baltic republics and Western Belarus, one of the last remaining territories occupied by the Soviet Union leading to Lithuania re-establishing its national symbols in 1988, with Latvia and Estonia following suit as well as nearby Ukraine in 1990.

Independence and opposition era
After the Belarusian Popular Front's proposal, the flag became the new flag of Belarus when it became an independent country in 1991. Following the 1995 Belarusian referendum, the white-red-white flag was abolished as a state flag and Alexander Lukashenko's supporters tore it to pieces on the roof of the Presidential Administration of Belarus.

After 1995 the white-red-white flag has been used as a symbol of the opposition to the regime of Lukashenko, most notably during protests after the 2006, 2010, 2015, and the 2020 presidential elections and at mass rallies on Freedom Day celebrations as well as Dziady memorial marches. The flag is not officially banned from public usage, but is treated by the authorities as an unregistered symbol which means that demonstration of it by political activists or sports fans can lead to arrests and confiscation of the flags. In early 2010,  political activist Siarhei Kavalenka was arrested for placing a white-red-white flag atop a Christmas tree on the central square of Vitebsk. The court gave Kavalenka three years of suspended sentence which was followed by a second arrest and Kavalenka's several weeks long hunger strike. The hunger strike was interrupted by force-feeding on 16 January 2012. According to Vadzim Smok in his research paper of 2013, only 8% of Belarusians considered the white-red-white flag as Belarus' true flag.

The flag has been widely used by opposition supporters during the 2020–2021 Belarusian protests in rallies in support of presidential candidate Sviatlana Tsikhanouskaya, and later after the disputed elections, in which, according to the official statement of the Central Election Commission, the current president of the country, Alexander Lukashenko, won the majority of votes. A popular variant used by protesters is the white-red-white flag with the historic Pahonia coat of arms. Initially though, there are reports that some opposition supporters have also used the current flag. As of 7 December 2020, Belarusian authorities are drafting a law that could ban the white-red-white flag.

Relationship to other flags
The white-red-white flag is almost identical to the flag of Wyszków in Poland, the flag of Berlare in Belgium, flags of Brielle and Enschede in the Netherlands, and the flag of the Atlántico Department in Colombia. The unrelated flag of Austria has the colours reversed.

Creators of the so-called "Russian anti-war flag" used in the 2022 anti-war protests in Russia list the similarity to the white-red-white flag as among its advantages.

See also 
 Flag of Belarus
 White-blue-white flag

References

External links

 
 The white-red-white flag of Belarus – Rada of the Belarusian Democratic Republic

 
National flags
National symbols of Belarus
Flags introduced in 1918
Flags introduced in 1991
Flag controversies